James Boag I ( – 9 November 1890) was the founder and proprietor of J. Boag & Sons, owner of the Boag's Brewery in Launceston, Tasmania, Australia.

Boag was born in Paisley, Renfrewshire, Scotland. He emigrated to Australia with his wife and four children in 1853, and arrived in Tasmania after three months in the Victorian gold fields. Once settled in Launceston he had 6 more children, including James Boag II. He worked at several local breweries before entering into partnership with his son James Boag II to run Esk Brewery. The brewery later became what is now known as Boag's Brewery.

He died aged 86 in Melbourne on 9 November 1890. His remains were transported to Launceston for the funeral service, which was held at St Andrew's Church. The cortege comprised a very large number of followers.

See also

References

1804 births
1890 deaths
People from Launceston, Tasmania
Australian Presbyterians
Businesspeople from Paisley, Renfrewshire
Scottish emigrants to colonial Australia
Australian brewers
Brewery workers
19th-century Australian businesspeople
Scottish brewers
Scottish Presbyterians
Australian company founders
19th-century Scottish businesspeople